Arlington High School is a public charter high school in Arlington, Oregon. It is part of the Arlington School District #3.

Academics 
In 2008, 100% of the school's seniors received a high school diploma. Of four students, four graduated and none dropped out.

Notable alumni 
 Doc Severinsen, musician

References 

High schools in Gilliam County, Oregon
Public high schools in Oregon